Percy the Park Keeper is a British animated 1996-1999 children's television series based on the popular books by British author Nick Butterworth. It features Percy, and many wild animals, including the Badger, the Fox, the Owl, the Mice, the Mole, the Robin, and so on. The series started out as four seasonal specials airing in the UK between December 1996 and December 1997. This was followed by thirteen ten-minute episodes between September and December 1999. "After the Storm" got a theatre adaptation in London on Christmas 2015. The franchise eventually got a commemorate in the form of a statue of Percy in Raphael Park.

Characters and voice cast
Percy the Park Keeper – (voiced by Jim Broadbent in the United Kingdom) – The show's title character who regularly maintains the park, and is still always able to find the time to have fun with the animals.
Fox – (voiced by David Holt) – A male fun-loving sort who tends to make others laugh and can still be quite sensitive.
Badger – (voiced by Enn Reitel and later by Chris Lang) – A male wise and sensible sort who often tries to organize games in the park to keep the other animals happy.
Rabbits – (male rabbits voiced by David Holt and the female rabbits voiced by Kate Harbour) – An excitable sort who easily gets timid at anything remotely scary.
Squirrels – (Mr Squirrel is voiced by Enn Reitel and later by David Holt and Mrs Squirrel is voiced by Kate Harbour) – An irritable sort who often buries nuts and acorns and cannot always remember where they put them in the first place.
Hedgehog – (voiced by David Holt) – A male quiet sort who finds his sharp spines problematic.
The Mice – (the male mice are voiced by David Holt and the female mice are voiced by Kate Harbour) – Playful sorts who are always happy to join in various challenges in the park.
The Ducks – (Mr Duck voiced by David Holt and Mrs Duck voiced by Kate Harbour) – Quarrelsome sorts who normally play at the duck pond and migrate when Winter comes to the park.
Owl – (voiced by Kate Harbour) – A female wise sort who never hunts at night time, like an ordinary owl. She is always active during the daytime, but she forgets things very easily.
Robin Redbreast – (voiced by David Holt) – Spends most of his time flying around the park and perching on trees.
Mole – (voiced by Enn Reitel and later by David Holt) – He is always in a rush and has trouble finding his way under the ground of the park.
 Narrator - (voiced in the audiobooks alternately by Richard Briers and Jim Broadbent) - Tells each of the stories.

Episodes

Specials (1996–1997)

Full episodes (1999)

Release
HIT Entertainment released "After the Storm" on VHS in September 1998.

References

External links

1996 British television series debuts
1999 British television series endings
1990s British animated television series
1990s British children's television series
British children's animated adventure television series
British children's animated comedy television series
British children's animated fantasy television series
British television shows based on children's books
English-language television shows
HIT Entertainment
Television series by Mattel Creations
ITV children's television shows
Literary characters introduced in 1989
Treehouse TV original programming